The following are the national records in speed skating in Chinese Taipei maintained by the Chinese Taipei Skating Union.

Men

Women

References

External links
 Chinese Taipei Skating Union web site

National records in speed skating
Speed skating-related lists
Speed skating
Records
Speed skating